Ferdous Ahmed (born 7 June 1972) is a Bangladeshi film actor and producer. He acts in Bangladesh and Indian Bengali films. He won Bangladesh National Film Award for Best Actor 5 times for his roles in the films Hothat Brishti (1998), Gangajatra (2009), Kusum Kusum Prem (2011), Ek Cup Cha (2014) and Putro (2018).

Filmography

References

Indian filmographies
Bangladeshi filmographies
Male actor filmographies